Ladislaus (  or   according to the case) is a masculine given name of Slavic origin.

It may refer to:

 Ladislaus of Hungary (disambiguation)
 Ladislaus I (disambiguation)
 Ladislaus II (disambiguation)
 Ladislaus III (disambiguation)
 Ladislaus IV (disambiguation) 
 Ladislaus the Posthumous or Ladislaus V of Hungary (1440–1457), also King of Bohemia
 Ladislaus of Naples (1377–1414), King of Naples
 Wenceslaus III of Bohemia (1289–1306), who took the name Ladislaus when he was crowned King of Hungary in 1301
 Ladislaus Bortkiewicz (1868–1931), Russian economist and statistician
 Ladislaus Hunyadi (1431–1457), Hungarian nobleman
 Ladislaus Jagiello (disambiguation)
 Ladislaus Kán (disambiguation)
 Ladislaus Kurpiel (1883–1930), Austrian footballer
 Ladislaus Pyrker (1772–1847), Hungarian Cistercian abbot, archbishop and poet
 Ladislaus Perera Ranasinghe (1913-1983), Sri Lankan Sinhala actor
 Ladislaus Rátót (died 1328), Hungarian nobleman and landowner
 Ladislaus Sunthaym (c. 1440–1512 or 1513), German historian, genealogist and geographer
 Ladislaus Szécsényi (1413–1460), Hungarian nobleman and landowner
 Ladislaus Vajda (1877–1933), Hungarian screenwriter

See also
 
 Ladislav, another given name
 Ladislao (disambiguation), Portuguese 
 László (disambiguation), Hungarian 
 Vladislav

Slavic masculine given names